Sauble Speedway is a 1/4 mile short track motor racing oval, located east of the beach community Sauble Beach, in Hepworth, Ontario, Canada. The track hosts a weekly Saturday night stock car racing program that runs from June to September each year, with additional Sunday night races on long weekends.

Overview
The speedway originally opened in 1969 as a 1/4 mile dirt track but was paved prior to the start of the 1971 season. 

The tracks weekly racing program features United 8's for eight cylinder late model cars, Combined 4's for four cylinder cars and Junior Late Models. The track also regularly features touring series including the APC United Late Model Series, Ontario Sportsman Series, OSCAAR Modifieds, Hot Rods and Pro Sprints, the Ontario Outlaw Super Late Model Series, Can-Am Midgets and Legends car racing.

The track was purchased in 2017 by local business owner Paul Gresel and NASCAR Pinty's Series driver Mark Dilley. The facility  received NASCAR sanctioning in 2018 and joined the NASCAR Whelen All-American Series.

See also
List of auto racing tracks in Canada
Sunset Speedway
Delaware Speedway

References

External links
Sauble Speedway Official Site
Motorsport venues in Ontario
Paved oval racing venues in Ontario
Motorsport in Canada
1969 establishments in Ontario
Sports venues completed in 1969
Tourist attractions in Bruce County